George Kliavkoff (born 1967) is an American college athletic administrator. He is the commissioner of the Pac-12 Conference, a position he has held since 2021. Kliavkoff has a diverse professional background in the sports and entertainment landscape, holding positions at Major League Baseball, NBCUniversal, Hulu, A&E Networks and — most recently prior to his Pac-12 appointment — MGM Resorts International.

Early life and education 
Kliavkoff attended Boston University, graduating in 1989 where he was a member of the 𝛫𝚺 fraternity, μψ chapter, and participated in rowing. He earned a Juris Doctor degree from the University of Virginia in 1993.

Career 
Kliavkoff launched his professional career as a lawyer before pivoting to a long line of positions in sports and entertainment. After four years at RealNetworks, he joined Major League Baseball in 2003 as an executive vice president for business with MLB Advanced Media. After three years in MLB, he became the chief digital officer for NBCUniversal where he helped launch Hulu. He moved to Hearst Communications in 2009 where he would spend seven years. In 2016, he was named CEO of Jaunt XR, a virtual reality content studio.

In 2018, Kliavkoff settled in Las Vegas and was named president of entertainment and sports at MGM Resorts International. He served on a number of Las Vegas-based boards including the WNBA, T-Mobile Arena, Cirque du Soleil and BetMGM.

Pac-12 Conference 
On May 13, 2021, Kliavkoff was announced as the Pac-12's choice to replace outgoing commissioner Larry Scott. He assumed the role on July 1, 2021, which began a five-year contract. University of Oregon president Michael H. Schill led the five-person search committee and described Kliavkoff as "the new prototype for a sports commissioner."

Kliavkoff inherited an embattled conference that faced issues with contentious campus relationships, lack of representation in the College Football Playoff, reports of irresponsible conference office spending and shrinking television rights revenues due to the poor performance of the Pac-12 Network.

Kliavkoff entered college sports for the first time in a rapidly changing space, with his start date coinciding with the beginning of the Name, Image and Likeness era.

Kliavkoff led an effort to form an Alliance between the Pac-12, the Big Ten and the ACC. It was announced on August 24, 2021, with the intention of creating non-conference scheduling opportunities and stabilizing membership. The Alliance, however, would later become a target of criticism for lacking any formal agreement and not preventing conference defections.

On March 29, 2022, the Pac-12 announced a shift to remote work from its employees in an effort to reduce high rent costs in San Francisco.

One day shy of Kliavkoff's one-year anniversary as commissioner of the conference, Pac-12 mainstays USC and UCLA unexpectedly announced intentions to depart for the Big Ten Conference, a move considered "gutting for the future of the Pac-12." With the conference's largest television market now removed, Kliavkoff was characterized as needing a "miracle" to keep the conference alive.

Personal 
Kliavkoff grew up in Scarsdale, New York. He and his wife Ellen have two children: Delaney and Henry.

References

External links 

 Pac-12 Conference profile

Living people
Pac-12 Conference commissioners
Boston University alumni
University of Virginia alumni
1967 births